INS Astradharini ("Weapon-holder", from  astraa, "Weapon" and धारिणी dhārini, "holder") (translated as "she who keeps weapons") is an indigenously designed and built torpedo launch and recovery vessel built by Shoft Shipyard for the Indian Navy. She was commissioned to Navy Service on 6 October 2015 at the Naval Base in Visakhapatnam. After commissioning, the ship entered the Eastern Naval Command.

Purpose
The vessel is a replacement of   INS Astravahini that was built by Goa Shipyard Limited and P.S. and Company for the Indian Navy. It was decommissioned on 17 July 2015 after 31 years of service. INS Astradharini will be used to carry out the technical trials of underwater weapons and systems like torpedoes and mines.

See also
List of active Indian Navy ships

References

Naval ships of India
Auxiliary ships of the Indian Navy
Ships built in India
Auxiliary training ship classes
2015 ships